Protactinium(V) bromide is an inorganic compound. It is a halide of protactinium, consisting of protactinium and bromine. It is radioactive and has a chemical formula of PaBr5, which is a red crystal of the monoclinic crystal system.

Preparation 
Protactinium(V) bromide can be obtained by reacting protactinium(V) chloride with boron tribromide at 500 to 550 °C.

3PaCl5 + 5BBr3 → 3PaBr5 + 5BCl3

It can also be obtained by reacting protactinium(V) oxide with aluminum bromide at 400 °C.

Physical properties 
Protactinium(V) bromide is an orange-red, crystalline, extremely moisture-sensitive solid that reacts violently with water and ammonia, but is persistent in absolutely dry air. It is insoluble in isopentane, dichloromethane and benzene, and in anhydrous acetonitrile is dissolves to form PaBr5•4CH3CN. It comes in several modifications. Below 400 °C as an α-modification and above 400 °C as a β-modification. The α-form has a monoclinic crystal structure of the space group P21/c (No. 14) and lattice parameters a = 1296 pm, b = 1282 pm, c = 992 pm, β = 108° and the β-form also has monoclinic crystal structure with space group P21/n (No. 14, position 2) and lattice parameters a = 838.5 pm, b = 1120.5 pm, c = 895.0 pm, β = 91.1°. The β form exists as a dimer. At 400 °C in a vacuum, protactinium(V) bromide sublimes. A γ-form, which has a β-uranium(V) chloride-type crystal structure, has also been detected.

References 

Bromides
Actinide halides
Protactinium compounds